Ricardo Alberto Ramírez (5 April 1973 – 1 May 2021) was an Argentine professional footballer who played for Racing Club, Sportivo Italiano, San Martín de San Juan, Juventud Antoniana, Estudiantes de Buenos Aires and  Berazategui.

He died at age 48 due to COVID-19 related respiratory complications.

References

1973 births
2021 deaths
Argentine footballers
Racing Club de Avellaneda footballers
Sportivo Italiano footballers
San Martín de San Juan footballers
Juventud Antoniana footballers
Estudiantes de Buenos Aires footballers
Place of death missing
A.D. Berazategui footballers
Argentine Primera División players
Sportspeople from Buenos Aires Province
Deaths from the COVID-19 pandemic in Argentina
Association footballers not categorized by position